Janowiec Kościelny  is a village in Nidzica County, Warmian-Masurian Voivodeship, in northern Poland. It is the seat of the gmina (administrative district) called Gmina Janowiec Kościelny.

The village has a population of 360.

References

Villages in Nidzica County